Rodney Cook Sr. Park, is a  park in the Vine City neighborhood of Atlanta, adjacent to the Mercedes-Benz Stadium. It is named after the politician Rodney Mims Cook Sr.  The park officially opened on 29 June 2021.

The park's construction was completed by a partnership among The Trust for Public Land, the City of Atlanta Department of Parks and Recreation, the City of Atlanta Department of Watershed Management, and the local community.

References

Parks in Atlanta
English Avenue and Vine City